Kelgukoerad is an Estonian criminal television series, which aired on the Kanal 2 television channel.

The series was on the air from 2006-2013.

Cast
 Kalju Komissarov as Mati Kelk (2006–2013)
 Madis Milling as Mart Kukk (2006–2013)
 Olaf Suuder as Robert "Rops" Rebane (2007–2012)
 Ita Ever as Elviira Memm (2006–2011)
 Kristofer Pai	as Andri (2006–2012)
 Romiina Luik as Twin Romiina  (2007–2012)
 Katarina Luik	as Twin Katarina (2007–2012)
 Kaie Mihkelson as Liisbet Kann (2008–2011)
 Ivo Uukkivi as Post (2006–2009) 
 Mait Malmsten	as Kõsta (2006–2009) 
 Priit Võigemast as Leo Pulk/Leonid Palka (2009–2012) 
 Ülle Kaljuste as Signe (2006–2009) 
 Taavi Eelmaa	as Priit Post (2006–2012) 
 Juhan Ulfsak as Kalle Kõsta (2010–2012) 
 Kadri Rämmeld	as Laura/Brita (2006–2008) 
 Ada Lundver as Malle Kukk (2007–2010) 
 Natali Lohk as Bärbel Orav (2011–2012) 
 Kairit Tuhkanen as Anna Post (2007–2010) 
 Liina Orlova as Aunt Agatha (2009–2010) 
 Karin Rask as Triin Mets (2007–2008) 
 Ithaka Maria as Milli (2008–2010) 
 Anti Kobin as Minister Kõrs (2008–2013) 
 Taavi Tõnisson as Peeter Pullerits (2008–2013) 
 Paul Laasik as Volli (2006–2007) 
 Hilje Murel as Lea Kõsta (2006)
 Liivika Hanstin as Kersti (2008–2012) 
 Arolin Raudva as Hele (2011) 
 Meelis Pai as Toomas (2007–2008) 
 Markko Aduson	as Felix (2010) 
 Liis-Katrin Avandi as Kirsika (2012–2013) 
 Vilma Luik as Heli Õnneoja (2009–2012) 
 Lenna Kuurmaa	as Lili (2010) 
 Merle Palmiste as Kertu Post (2006–2007) 
 Arvo Kukumägi	as Tõnn/Jaak (2006–2011) 
 Märt Visnapuu as Ülo (2007–2011) 
 Britta Soll as Anu Murakas (2007–2008) 
 Merilin Kirbits as Kairi Lepik (2013) 
 Kalju Orro as Hendrik Soopalu (2012) 
 Maria Avdjuško as Heleene Bauman (2012) 
 Kenneth Tutt as Gregor (2011) 
 Mairi Jõgi as Aile Tammer (2012)
 Kersti Kreismann as Ella (2008) 
 Helena Merzin as Mari (2007) 
 Kärt Kross as Airi/Kertu (2006–2012)
 Tõnu Oja as Joosep Talivere (2010–2012)  
 Andres Ild as Gradnfather Artur (2007) 
 Meeli Sööt as Roosi/Lilli (2008–2011) 
 Mari-Liis Lill as Stella Veerik (2008) 
 Ivo Eensalu as Manfred Aavakivi/Alo Smitt (2007–2011) 
 Merle Jääger	as Miia (2009) 
 Grete Klein as Secretary Mia (2010–2011) 
 Helene Vannari as  Miralda/Matilda Põder/Tea (2007–2013) 
 Mirtel Pohla as Paula (2006)

References

Estonian television series
Kanal 2 original programming